Randleman Graded School, also known as Randleman High School and Shaw Furniture Industries Showroom, is a historic school building located at Randleman, Randolph County, North Carolina.  It was built in 1906, and is a two-story brick building, five-bays wide and three bays deep, with a low-hipped roof and flanking hip-roofed two-bay wings added in 1926. The building is Romanesque Revival influenced and features a projecting entrance pavilion with a massive Richardsonian Romanesque-influenced arch. In 1937, an extension to the east wing was added. The building housed a school until 1960, then a furniture showroom until 2000.

It was added to the National Register of Historic Places in 2005.

References

School buildings on the National Register of Historic Places in North Carolina
Romanesque Revival architecture in North Carolina
School buildings completed in 1906
Buildings and structures in Randolph County, North Carolina
National Register of Historic Places in Randolph County, North Carolina
1906 establishments in North Carolina